Al-Taj Gümüshtegin, also known as Fakhr al-Dawla Gümüshtegin al-Tājī, eunuch governor of Baalbek through 1110, a freedman of Tutush I.  Al-Taj briefly jailed Tutush’s son Irtash in 1104 before he was released by Toghtekin.  He was replaced by Toghtekin’s son Buri.  In exchange for Baalbek, Toghtekin granted al-Taj the fortress of Salkhad where he died in 1131.

References
 
 Gibb, N. A. R., Editor, The Damascus Chronicle of the Crusades.  Extracted and translated from the Chronicle of ibn al-Qalānisi, Luzac & Company, London, 1932, pgs. 63-65, 71, 77. 79

Muslims of the Crusades
12th-century Turkic people
12th century in Asia
Baalbek District
Eunuchs
Medieval slaves